The GLAAD Media Award for Outstanding Kids and Family Programming is one of the annual GLAAD Media Awards which is offered to the best youth-oriented LGBT-related television series. The category was first established in 2018 at the 28th GLAAD Media Awards following the rise in LGBTQ representation in children's television. The award was established as part of GLAAD's work to increase the quality and quantity of LGBTQ characters and stories. Starting at the 32nd GLAAD Media Awards, a separate category was created for Children's Programming, honoring works aired for younger children. Starting at the 34th GLAAD Media Awards, the category was split into Animated and Live Action categories.

Background
With the announcement of the category, GLAAD CEO Sarah Kate Ellis release a statement explaining that “GLAAD is committed to advancing representation of LGBTQ people and stories at every stage of our lives, and the groundbreaking addition of the “Outstanding Kids & Family Programming” category will raise the bar for current and future LGBTQ inclusion in this hugely popular and impactful genre. It’s vital that my two kids see their LGBTQ family portrayed in entertainment and media, and that young people, who are coming out earlier and in greater numbers, see their lives and experiences reflected in thoughtful, loving, and affirming ways.”

Winners and nominations

2010s

2020s

Programmes with multiple nominations
4 Nominations
 High School Musical: The Musical: The Series
 Steven Universe
 The Loud House

3 Nominations
 Andi Mack
 She-Ra and the Princesses of Power
 The Owl House

2 Nominations
 Adventure Time
 Amphibia
 Craig of the Creek
 Diary of a Future President
 First Day
 Power Rangers Dino Fury
 The Baby-Sitters Club

Networks with multiple nominations
17 Nominations
 Netflix

10 Nominations
 Disney+
 Disney Channel

8 Nominations
 Cartoon Network

7 Nominations
 Nickelodeon

3 Nominations
 Hulu

2 Nominations
 Dreamworks Animation

References

External links
 GLAAD Media Awards

GLAAD Media Awards